Rolon or Rolón may refer to:

Formula Rolon, open wheel single seater Formula Racing car made and raced in India
Ismael Blas Rolón Silvero (born 1914), Paraguan prelate of the Roman Catholic Church
Luis Román Rolón (born 1968), retired boxer from Puerto Rico
Raimundo Rolón (1903–1981), briefly President of Paraguay

See also
Roloff